Vagrant, (May 17, 1873 – c.1890) was an American Thoroughbred racehorse that is best known for his 1876 Kentucky Derby win. Vagrant was the first of nine geldings to win the Kentucky Derby and was a white-stockinged bay colt sired by Virgil out of the mare Lazy (by Scythian (GB)). Virgil was notable for breeding successful nineteenth century race horses and stood at  Milton H. Sanford's Preakness Stud in Lexington, Kentucky. Vagrant is related, through his sire, to two other early Kentucky Derby winners, Hindoo (1881) and Ben Ali (1886).

Racing career
While Virgil was still a little known sire, Vagrant was sold for just $250 to Thomas J. Nichols at the Preakness Stud 1874 yearling sale. A promising two-year-old, Vagrant won the 1875 Belle Meade Stakes, Alexander Stakes and Sanford Stakes while owned by Thomas J. Nichols, and sharing the title of U.S. Champion 2-Year-Old Colt with Parole that year.

As a three-year-old, Vagrant won five of his six starts at up to a mile, and was clearly the top juvenile of 1876. That year, Vagrant won the Phoenix Hotel Stakes by 50 yards and also won the Grand Exposition Stakes in Philadelphia.[3],[4}

After the Phoenix Stakes win and before the Kentucky Derby, millionaire William B. Astor, Jr. purchased Vagrant for $7,000, an impressive figure for a thoroughbred of that era.[4]

The second Kentucky Derby was run on a fast track with a field of 11 horses.[2] Vagrant won the Derby, with Robert Swim up, by two lengths over the betting favorite, Parole, winning a total of $2,950.[2]

Vagrant injured his leg at the 1876 Philadelphia Grand Exposition Stakes and was rested for a season in 1877 until his leg healed in 1878.

Vagrant was sold to James J. Bevins in the 1880s and raced under his name until 1882, when at the Jerome Park Racetrack, Vagrant became very lame after a race. His racing stats list only one start in 1883, indicating that Vagrant, at age ten, was permanently retired from racing.

Vagrant was widely rumored to have been a vegetable cart horse in Lexington after his racing career, having been sold into this service sometime after 1883.

A 1910 Daily Racing Form article states that Vagrant died at around 17 years of age (c. 1890) while being used as a saddle horse for a woman that lived in Long Island.

Vagrant total race record

Pedigree

References

1873 racehorse births
Kentucky Derby winners
Racehorses bred in Kentucky
Racehorses trained in the United States
Thoroughbred family A13
Byerley Turk sire line